Munneswaram or  Munnessarama is a village in the Puttalam District of Sri Lanka. It is well known for its Munneswaram temple.

See also
 Munneswaram temple
 Puttalam District
 Chillaw

References

Populated places in North Western Province, Sri Lanka
Populated places in Puttalam District